Maduravoyal taluk is a taluk of the city district of Chennai in the Indian state of Tamil Nadu. The centre of the taluk is the neighbourhood of Maduravoyal. The headquarters of the taluk is Ambattur division. On 4 January 2018, Chennai district was expanded by annexing Maduravoyal taluk.

Revenue villages and towns
Some of the revenue towns and villages of this taluk are:
 Nerkundram
 Nolambur
 Maduravoyal
 Valasaravakkam
 Alapakkam
 Ramapuram
 Porur
 Karambakkam
 Vanagaram
 Thiruverkadu
 Chettiaragaram
 Sivapoodam
 Adayalampattu
 Ayanabakkam
 Koladi
 Perumalagaram
 Noombal
 Ayapakkam

References

External links
http://tnmaps.tn.nic.in/vill.php?dcode=01&centcode=0010&tlkname=Maduravoyal

Taluks of Chennai district